Campbell Newman led the Liberal National Party of Queensland to its first victory at the 2012 state election. His interim Ministry of three members was sworn in on 26 March 2012, pending his determination of the make-up of his full Ministry. His replaced the Ministry of Anna Bligh. Following his party's loss at the 2015 state election, Newman soon resigned as Premier to make way for the ministry of Annastacia Palaszczuk.

Full list

Initial Ministry
The members of the first full ministry, sworn in on 3 April 2012, are as follows:

Changes
16 April 2012: David Gibson resigned as Minister for Police and Community Safety, and Jack Dempsey was appointed acting Police Minister. At the same time, it was announced he would be appointed to that post and be replaced as Minister for Aboriginal and Torres Strait Islander Affairs by Glen Elmes, which happened on 23 April 2012.
14 November 2012: Bruce Flegg resigned as Minister for Housing and Public Works and Energy and Water Supply Minister Mark McArdle became Acting Housing and Public Works Minister. On 19 November, Tim Mander, then Assistant Minister for Sport and Racing, took over as Minister for Housing and Public Works. Ted Malone became Assistant Minister for Emergency Volunteers.
4 February 2013: Following the 2013 Queensland disaster flooding, Newman appointed Local Government Minister David Crisafulli to the new portfolio of Community Recovery and Resilience, in addition to his Local Government responsibilities.
15 February 2013: Ros Bates resigned as Minister for Science, IT, Innovation and The Arts, and John-Paul Langbroek (the Education, Training and Employment Minister) became acting minister. On 20 February, Ian Walker took over the portfolio, a promotion from Assistant Minister for Planning Reform. Assistant Minister for Child Safety Rob Molhoek became Assistant Minister for Planning Reform and Deputy Whip Tarnya Smith succeeded him as Assistant Minister for Child Safety.
1 November 2013: Following Mike Keelty's Police and Community Safety review, Jack Dempsey had his portfolio responsibilities changed. Corrections was moved to Department of Justice and Attorney-General and ambulances were moved to Department of Health. As a result, Minister Dempsey's title changed to Minister for Police, Fire and Emergency Services and was sworn in by the Governor on 1 November 2013.

See also
Shadow Ministry of Annastacia Palaszczuk

References

Queensland ministries